In modern context Bra and Ket notation can be compared to modern row and column vectors with complex components. Matrix multiplication rules apply with a result usually of more than one row and column. Vector inside and outside products are also following modern rules. Paul Dirac invented the notation Bra and Ket before the present notation of row and column vectors was developed. The complex components are useful in deriving wave functions such as solutions to the Schrödinger equation and in making probability calculations for particle location or momentum in quantum mechanics. Bra and Ket notation is still used in describing quantum mechanics.

As Created By Paul Dirac
In quantum mechanics, bra–ket notation, or Dirac notation, is used ubiquitously to denote quantum states.

A ket is of the form . Mathematically it denotes a vector, in an abstract (complex) vector space , and physically it represents a state of some quantum system.

A bra is of the form .

Assume that on  there exists an inner product  with antilinear first argument, which makes  an inner product space. Then with this inner product each vector  can be identified with a corresponding linear form, by placing the vector in the anti-linear first slot of the inner product: . The correspondence between these notations is then . The purpose of this linear form  can now be understood in terms of making projections on the state , to find how linearly dependent two states are, etc.

For the vector space , kets can be identified with column vectors, and bras with row vectors. Combinations of bras, kets, and linear operators are interpreted using matrix multiplication. If  has the standard Hermitian inner product , under this identification, the identification of kets and bras and vice versa provided by the inner product is taking the Hermitian conjugate (denoted ).

It is common to suppress the vector or linear form from the bra–ket notation and only use a label inside the typography for the bra or ket. For example, the spin operator  on a two dimensional space  of spinors, has eigenvalues  with eigenspinors . As above, kets and bras with the same label are interpreted as kets and bras corresponding to each other using the inner product. In particular, when also identified with row and column vectors, kets and bras with the same label are identified with Hermitian conjugate column and row vectors. 

Introduction
Bra–ket notation is a notation for linear algebra and linear operators on complex vector spaces together with their dual space both in the finite-dimensional and infinite-dimensional case. It is specifically designed to ease the types of calculations that frequently come up in quantum mechanics. Its use in quantum mechanics is quite widespread. Many phenomena that are explained using quantum mechanics are explained using bra–ket notation.

Vector spaces

Vectors vs kets

In mathematics, the term "vector" is used for an element of any vector space. In physics, however, the term "vector" is much more specific: "vector" refers almost exclusively to quantities like displacement or velocity, which have components that relate directly to the three dimensions of space, or relativistically, to the four of spacetime. Such vectors are typically denoted with over arrows, boldface or indices.

In quantum mechanics, a quantum state is typically represented as an element of a complex Hilbert space, for example, the infinite-dimensional vector space of all possible wavefunctions (square integrable functions mapping each point of 3D space to a complex number) or some more abstract Hilbert space constructed more algebraically.

Symbols, letters, numbers, or even words—whatever serves as a convenient label—can be used as the label inside a ket, with the  making clear that the label indicates a vector in vector space. In other words, the symbol "" has a specific and universal mathematical meaning, while just the "" by itself does not. Nevertheless, for convenience, there is usually some logical scheme behind the labels inside kets, such as the common practice of labeling energy eigenkets in quantum mechanics through a listing of their quantum numbers.

Notation

Since kets are just vectors in a Hermitian vector space, they can be manipulated using the usual rules of linear algebra. For example:

Note how the last line above involves infinitely many different kets, one for each real number .

Since the ket is an element of a vector space, a bra  is an element of its dual space, i.e. a bra is a linear functional which is a linear map from the vector space to the complex numbers. Thus, it is useful to think of kets and bras as being elements of different vector spaces (see below however) with both being different useful concepts.

A bra  and a ket  (i.e. a functional and a vector), can be combined to an operator  of rank one with outer product

Inner product and bra–ket identification on Hilbert space

The bra–ket notation is particularly useful in Hilbert spaces which have an inner product that allows Hermitian conjugation and identifying a vector with a continuous linear functional, i.e. a ket with a bra, and vice versa (see Riesz representation theorem). The inner product on Hilbert space  (with the first argument anti linear as preferred by physicists) is fully equivalent to an (anti-linear) identification between the space of kets and that of bras in the bra ket notation: for a vector ket  define a functional (i.e. bra)  by

Bras and kets as row and column vectors

In the simple case where we consider the vector space , a ket can be identified with a column vector, and a bra as a row vector. Moreover, conventions are set up in such a way that writing bras, kets, and linear operators next to each other simply imply matrix multiplication. In particular the outer product  of a column and a row vector ket and bra can be identified with matrix multiplication (column vector times row vector equals matrix).

For a finite-dimensional vector space, using a fixed orthonormal basis, the inner product can be written as a matrix multiplication of a row vector with a column vector:

Based on this, the bras and kets can be defined as:

and then it is understood that a bra next to a ket implies matrix multiplication.

The conjugate transpose (also called Hermitian conjugate) of a bra is the corresponding ket and vice versa:

because if one starts with the bra

then performs a complex conjugation, and then a matrix transpose, one ends up with the ket

Writing elements of a finite dimensional (or mutatis mutandis, countably infinite) vector space as a column vector of numbers requires picking a basis. Picking a basis is not always helpful because quantum mechanics calculations involve frequently switching between different bases (e.g. position basis, momentum basis, energy eigenbasis), and one can write something like "" without committing to any particular basis. In situations involving two different important basis vectors, the basis vectors can be taken in the notation explicitly and here will be referred simply as "" and "".

Non-normalizable states and non-Hilbert spaces 

Bra–ket notation can be used even if the vector space is not a Hilbert space.

In quantum mechanics, it is common practice to write down kets which have infinite norm, i.e. non-normalizable wavefunctions. Examples include states whose wavefunctions are Dirac delta functions or infinite plane waves. These do not, technically, belong to the Hilbert space itself. However, the definition of "Hilbert space" can be broadened to accommodate these states (see the Gelfand–Naimark–Segal construction or rigged Hilbert spaces). The bra–ket notation continues to work in an analogous way in this broader context.

Banach spaces are a different generalization of Hilbert spaces. In a Banach space , the vectors may be notated by kets and the continuous linear functionals by bras. Over any vector space without topology, we may also notate the vectors by kets and the linear functionals by bras. In these more general contexts, the bracket does not have the meaning of an inner product, because the Riesz representation theorem does not apply.

Usage in quantum mechanics

The mathematical structure of quantum mechanics is based in large part on linear algebra:
Wave functions and other quantum states can be represented as vectors in a complex Hilbert space. (The exact structure of this Hilbert space depends on the situation.) In bra–ket notation, for example, an electron might be in the "state" . (Technically, the quantum states are rays of vectors in the Hilbert space, as  corresponds to the same state for any nonzero complex number .)
Quantum superpositions can be described as vector sums of the constituent states.
Measurements are associated with linear operators (called observables) on the Hilbert space of quantum states.
Dynamics are also described by linear operators on the Hilbert space. For example, in the Schrödinger picture, there is a linear time evolution operator  with the property that if an electron is in state  right now, at a later time it will be in the state , the same  for every possible .
Wave function normalization is scaling a wave function so that its norm is 1.

Since virtually every calculation in quantum mechanics involves vectors and linear operators, it can involve, and often does involve, bra–ket notation. A few examples follow:

Spinless position–space wave function

The Hilbert space of a spin-0 point particle is spanned by a "position basis" , where the label  extends over the set of all points in position space. This label is the eigenvalue of the position operator acting on such a basis state, . Since there are an uncountably infinite number of vector components in the basis, this is an uncountably infinite-dimensional Hilbert space. The dimensions of the Hilbert space (usually infinite) and position space (usually 1, 2 or 3) are not to be conflated.

On the left-hand side,  is a function mapping any point in space to a complex number; on the right-hand side, 
 
is a ket consisting of a superposition of kets with relative coefficients specified by that function.

It is then customary to define linear operators acting on wavefunctions in terms of linear operators acting on kets, by

For instance, the momentum operator  has the following coordinate representation,

The differential operator must be understood to be an abstract operator, acting on kets, that has the effect of differentiating wavefunctions once the expression is projected onto the position basis, 
even though, in the momentum basis, this operator amounts to a mere multiplication operator (by ). That is, to say,

or

Overlap of states
In quantum mechanics the expression  is typically interpreted as the probability amplitude for the state  to collapse into the state . Mathematically, this means the coefficient for the projection of  onto . It is also described as the projection of state  onto state .

Changing basis for a spin-1/2 particle
A stationary spin- particle has a two-dimensional Hilbert space. One orthonormal basis is:

Since these are a basis, any quantum state of the particle can be expressed as a linear combination (i.e., quantum superposition) of these two states:

A different basis for the same Hilbert space is:

Again, any state of the particle can be expressed as a linear combination of these two:

In vector form, you might write

depending on which basis you are using. In other words, the "coordinates" of a vector depend on the basis used.

Pitfalls and ambiguous uses

There are some conventions and uses of notation that may be confusing or ambiguous for the non-initiated or early student.

Separation of inner product and vectors
A cause for confusion is that the notation does not separate the inner-product operation from the notation for a (bra) vector. If a (dual space) bra-vector is constructed as a linear combination of other bra-vectors (for instance when expressing it in some basis) the notation creates some ambiguity and hides mathematical details. Consider the following dual space bra-vector in the basis :

It has to be determined by convention if the complex numbers  are inside or outside of the inner product, and each convention gives different results.

Reuse of symbols
It is common to use the same symbol for labels and constants. For example, where the symbol  is used simultaneously as the name of the operator , its eigenvector  and the associated eigenvalue .

Hermitian conjugate of kets
It is common to see the usage , where the dagger corresponds to the Hermitian conjugate. In other words,  is just a vector, while  is the combination of a vector and an inner product.

Operations inside bras and kets
This is done for a fast notation of scaling vectors. This can be ambiguous since  is simply a label for a state, and not a mathematical object on which operations can be performed. This usage is more common when denoting vectors as tensor products, where part of the labels are moved outside the designed slot, e.g. .

Linear operators

Linear operators acting on kets

A linear operator is a map that inputs a ket and outputs a ket. (In order to be called "linear", it is required to have certain properties.)

In an -dimensional Hilbert space, we can impose a basis on the space and represent  in terms of its coordinates as a  column vector. The ket-vector  can now be computed by matrix multiplication.

Linear operators are ubiquitous in the theory of quantum mechanics. For example, observable physical quantities are represented by self-adjoint operators, such as energy or momentum, whereas transformative processes are represented by unitary linear operators such as rotation or the progression of time.

Linear operators acting on bras

Operators can also be viewed as acting on bras from the right hand side.

(in other words, a function composition). This expression is commonly written as (cf. energy inner product)

Then the bra  can be computed by normal matrix multiplication.

If the same state vector appears on both bra and ket side,

then this expression gives the expectation value, or mean or average value, of the observable represented by operator  for the physical system in the state .

Outer products

denotes the rank-one operator with the rule 

For a finite-dimensional vector space, the outer product can be understood as simple matrix multiplication:

The outer product is an  matrix, as expected for a linear operator.

One of the uses of the outer product is to construct projection operators.

This is an idempotent in the algebra of observables that acts on the Hilbert space.

Hermitian conjugate operator

In other words,

If  is expressed as an  matrix, then  is its conjugate transpose.

Self-adjoint operators, where , play an important role in quantum mechanics; for example, an observable is always described by a self-adjoint operator. If  is a self-adjoint operator, then  is always a real number (not complex). This implies that expectation values of observables are real.

Properties
Bra–ket notation was designed to facilitate the formal manipulation of linear-algebraic expressions. Some of the properties that allow this manipulation are listed herein.

Linearity
 Since bras are linear functionals, 
 By the definition of addition and scalar multiplication of linear functionals in the dual space,

Associativity
Given any expression involving complex numbers, bras, kets, inner products, outer products, and/or linear operators (but not addition), written in bra–ket notation, the parenthetical groupings do not matter (i.e., the associative property holds). For example:

and so forth. The expressions on the right (with no parentheses whatsoever) are allowed to be written unambiguously because of the equalities on the left. Note that the associative property does not hold for expressions that include nonlinear operators, such as the antilinear time reversal operator in physics.

Hermitian conjugation
Bra–ket notation makes it particularly easy to compute the Hermitian conjugate (also called dagger, and denoted ) of expressions. The formal rules are:
 The Hermitian conjugate of a bra is the corresponding ket, and vice versa.
 The Hermitian conjugate of a complex number is its complex conjugate.
 The Hermitian conjugate of the Hermitian conjugate of anything (linear operators, bras, kets, numbers) is itself—i.e., 
 Given any combination of complex numbers, bras, kets, inner products, outer products, and/or linear operators, written in bra–ket notation, its Hermitian conjugate can be computed by reversing the order of the components, and taking the Hermitian conjugate of each.

These rules are sufficient to formally write the Hermitian conjugate of any such expression; some examples are as follows:
 Kets: 
 Inner products:  Note that  is a scalar, so the Hermitian conjugate is just the complex conjugate, i.e., 
 Matrix elements: 
 Outer products:

Composite bras and kets
Two Hilbert spaces  and  may form a third space  by a tensor product. In quantum mechanics, this is used for describing composite systems. (The exception to this is if the subsystems are actually identical particles. In that case, the situation is a little more complicated.)

This is written in various notations:

See quantum entanglement and the EPR paradox for applications of this product.

The unit operator
Consider a complete orthonormal system (basis),

for a Hilbert space , with respect to the norm from an inner product .

From basic functional analysis, it is known that any ket  can also be written as

with  the inner product on the Hilbert space.

From the commutativity of kets with (complex) scalars, it follows that

must be the identity operator, which sends each vector to itself.

This, then, can be inserted in any expression without affecting its value; for example

where, in the last line, the Einstein summation convention has been used to avoid clutter.

In this case, it is particularly useful to insert the unit operator into the bracket one time or more.

For more information, see Resolution of the identity, 
 where 

Since , plane waves follow, 

In his book (1958), Ch. III.20, Dirac defines the standard ket which, up to a normalization, is the translationally invariant momentum eigenstate  in the momentum representation, i.e., . Consequently, the corresponding wavefunction is a constant, and 
 as well as 

Notation used by mathematicians 

The object physicists are considering when using bra–ket notation is a Hilbert space (a complete inner product space).

That is,

This is because of literal symbolic substitutions. Let  and let . This gives

One ignores the parentheses and removes the double bars.

Moreover, mathematicians usually write the dual entity not at the first place, as the physicists do, but at the second one, and they usually use not an asterisk but an overline (which the physicists reserve for averages and the Dirac spinor adjoint) to denote complex conjugate numbers; i.e., for scalar products mathematicians usually write

whereas physicists would write for the same quantity

See also

 Angular momentum diagrams (quantum mechanics)
 -slit interferometric equation
 Quantum state
 Inner product space

Notes

References 
 . Also see his standard text, The Principles of Quantum Mechanics, IV edition, Clarendon Press (1958),

External links
Richard Fitzpatrick, "Quantum Mechanics: A graduate level course", The University of Texas at Austin. Includes:
 1. Ket space
 2. Bra space
 3. Operators
 4. The outer product
 5. Eigenvalues and eigenvectors
Robert Littlejohn, Lecture notes on "The Mathematical Formalism of Quantum mechanics", including bra–ket notation. University of California, Berkeley.

Information theory
Quantum information science
Linear algebra
Mathematical notation
Paul Dirac
Linear functionals